The 1840–41 Royal Engineers maps of Palestine, Lebanon and Syria was an early scientific mapping of Palestine (including a detailed mapping of Jerusalem), Lebanon and Syria.

It represented the second modern, triangulation-based, attempt at surveying Palestine. 

It has occasionally been mislabeled as an Ordnance Survey map; in fact none of the officers worked for the Ordnance Survey, which was a separate organization. The Ordnance Survey of Jerusalem, carried out almost 25 years later, was a separate and materially more detailed endeavor.

Jerusalem map
The Jerusalem map was printed privately for the Board of Ordnance in August 1841. It was published in a reduced form in Alderson's ‘’Professional Papers of the Royal Engineers’’ in 1845, and subsequently as a supplement to the 1849 second edition of George Williams’ The Holy City: Historical, Topographical, and Antiquarian Notices of Jerusalem together with a 130-page memoir on the plan. The memoir contained a three-page appendix defending the plan from criticism received from Edward Robinson.

Regional maps
The regional maps were never published in their entirety. A private printing for the British Foreign Office was produced in 1846. The only published map, Map 2, was published in Charles Henry Churchill's book on Mount Lebanon. Map 3 was used in the creation of Van de Velde's map. 

Charles Wilson later explained that the data "was in too fragmentary a state for publication".

Criticism
The survey contained a number of flaws. The theodolite was often operated by Symonds alone, miscalculations were made around heights (e.g. on the Sea of Galilee), and the outlines of the Haram es-Sharif in Jerusalem were known to have been miscalculated. As such, scholars such as Edward Robinson and August Petermann chose not to trust the work.

List of officers involved in the survey
Edward Aldrich
Julian Symonds
Charles Rochfort Scott
Ralph Carr Alderson
Frederick Robe
 Charles Francis Skyring
Richard Wilbraham

Gallery

Regional maps

City maps

Bibliography

Primary sources

Secondary sources

 British surveyors in Palestine and Syria, 1840–1841', International Cartographic Conference A Coruña 2005

References

19th-century maps and globes
1841 documents
Old maps of Jerusalem
Ordnance Survey
Collection of The National Archives (United Kingdom)
Maps of Palestine (region)